Phineas Bowles  may refer to:
 Phineas Bowles (died 1722), British Army  Major-General
His son Phineas Bowles (1690–1749), British Army Lieutenant-General, MP for Bewdley 1735–41